"So Hot" is a song recorded by South Korean girl group Wonder Girls. It was initially released on May 22, 2008, for digital download. Afterwards, the maxi-single titled "So Hot (The 3rd Project)" was released on June 3, 2008. The single became an instant hit and quickly a number one hit on various online and offline charts.

Background
In order to promote the single, JYP Entertainment first released teaser pictures of each member in May 2008, showing the Wonder Girls in their new "sexy image". Starting with Yeeun, pictures were released on 5 consecutive days, ending with Sohee's pictures. Following the pictures, "So Hot" was previewed on their website. During this time, there were rumours that past member Hyuna would be returning to the group; JYP Entertainment confirmed that this was not the case. Model Irene Kim came up with the leopard print concept for "So Hot" while interning at JYP.

Release
"So Hot" was first given a digital release on May 22, 2008; the song topped online charts in the next few days. The full single was released on June 3, 2008, given the subtitle The 3rd Project.  In addition to the title track, the single also contained new songs "This Time" and "You're Out" as well as the rap version of "Tell Me", which was unreleased until this point.

JYP Entertainment stated in June 2009 that "So Hot" would be the third English single for the group, after "Tell Me".  On May 15, 2010, they released their second American EP 2 Different Tears (also known as 2DT), which includes "So Hot" on the track list.

Versions
The original version of "So Hot" can be found on the girls' single album of the same name. The original version features vocals from the second line-up consisting of Sunye, Yeeun, Sohee, Sunmi, and Yubin. The song was later re-recorded for the Japanese release of their greatest hits album WonderBest (2012) and features the band's third line-up consisting of Sunye, Yeeun, Sohee, Yubin, and Hyerim, with previous Sunmi's vocals removed. "So Hot" was also made available on the 2010 EP 2 Different Tears, but does not feature vocals from the third line-up, only the second line-up.

YG Entertainment made a remix of the song, titled "So Hot (The Black Label Remix)", where it was performed by girl group Blackpink. It was performed at the group's concert in Osaka and at the 2017 SBS Gayo Daejeon on December 25, 2017.

Live performances

The Wonder Girls began their comeback performances on May 31, 2008, on MBC's Show! Music Core, performing "So Hot" and "This Time".  The members sported a brand new mature look, wearing leopard print outfits; future performances showcased varying outfits based around the print. A music video was produced for the song, showing the girls in various situations, with men instantly falling in love with them. "So Hot" became an instant hit and was the number one song on MBC's show Music Core and on SBS's Inkigayo for three consecutive weeks. Due to vocal chord problems, Kim Yubin lipsynced her parts, as per her doctor's orders, until the end of July 2008.

Accolades

Track listing

Charts
The single charted at number three on South Korea's monthly album chart, selling 31,840 copies. By September 2008, the single had sold 49,499 copies.

Release history

Notes

References

Wonder Girls songs
JYP Entertainment singles
2008 singles
Korean-language songs
Songs written by Park Jin-young
2008 songs